Aliabad (also Romanized as ‘Alīābād and Alīābād; also known as ‘Alīābād-e Qohsār) is a village in Barzavand Rural District, in the Central District of Ardestan County, Isfahan Province, Iran. At the 2006 census, its population was 23, in 11 families.

References 

Populated places in Ardestan County